The Central African Republic participated at the 2017 Summer Universiade, in Taipei, Taiwan with 2 competitors in 2 sports.

Competitors
The following table lists the Central African Republic delegation per sport and gender.

Athletics

Taekwondo

References

Nations at the 2017 Summer Universiade